Robins Air Force Base  is a major United States Air Force installation located in Houston County, Georgia, United States. The base is named in honor of Brig Gen Augustine Warner Robins, the Air Force's "father of logistics". The base is the single largest industrial complex in Georgia, employing a workforce of over 25,584 civilian, contractor, and military members. 

Robins AFB is the home of the Air Force Materiel Command's Warner Robins Air Logistics Complex (WR-ALC) (FLZ) which is the worldwide manager for a wide range of aircraft, engines, missiles, software and avionics and accessories components. The commander of WR-ALC is Brigadier General Jennifer Hammerstedt. It is one of three Air Force Air Logistic Complexes, the others being Oklahoma City Air Logistics Complex (OC-ALC) at Tinker Air Force Base, Oklahoma, and Ogden Air Logistics Complex (OO-ALC) at Hill Air Force Base, Utah.

The host unit at Robins AFB is the 78th Air Base Wing (78 ABW) which provides services and support for the Warner Robins Air Logistics Complex and its tenant organizations.

History

The War Department, in search of a site for an Army Air Corps Depot, selected the sleepy whistle-stop town known as Wellston, Georgia, 18 miles south of Macon. Army Colonel Charles Thomas, originally from Atlanta, landed at the Herbert Smart Airport near Camp Wheeler near Macon in October 1941 to oversee the building of the location which would later become the home to Wellston Air Depot at Robins Field (later to become Robins AFB).

It was Col. Thomas who chose the name Robins for his mentor Brig. Gen. Augustine Warner Robins. Brig. Gen. Robins is considered the "father of logistics" in the United States Air Force for his system of cataloging supplies and materials. He had a lengthy military career prior to becoming the chief of the Air Corps Materiel Division. Robins traveled in China disguised as a millionaire tourist, collecting intelligence for the Army. He also went to Mexico where he served under Gen. John J. Pershing in the Army's campaign against Pancho Villa. He trained during World War I to become a pilot earning his wings in June 1918. He didn't get to see combat because the war was ending. Robins suffered a near-fatal plane crash in 1921 in which his jaw and arm were severely broken. Brig. Gen. Robins died of a heart attack on Father's Day, 16 June 1940 at Randolph Field, Texas, while he was Commandant of the Air Corps Training Center.

After World War II, the number of military and civilian employees dropped until in March 1946 it reached a total of only 3,900.  The workforce grew again as the base supported the Berlin Airlift, until by 1949 the workforce had grown again to 11,000. When the Air Force closed down its maintenance depots at the former Brookley AFB in Mobile, Alabama and the former Olmsted AFB in Middleton Township, Pennsylvania, Robins AFB assumed the workload of these depots.

On 28 October 1949, Robins AFB became the headquarters of the 14th Air Force, the numbered air force responsible for administering the Air Force Reserve and the Air National Guard.

Some Robins AFB SAC units went to Guam or Vietnam during the Vietnam War and took part in many of the bombing missions. Maintenance teams from Robins frequently traveled to Southeast Asia to repair severely damaged aircraft. Robins AFB eventually managed the Lockheed C-141, C-7, and the F-15 Eagle as well as modifying the C-130s to the gunship configuration.

Robins played a key role in the Vietnam War (1964–73), supplying troops and materiel through the Southeast Asian Pipeline and modifying AC-119G/K and AC-130 gunships. Also playing a role were the C-141, the C-130, the C-123, and the C-124 cargo aircraft—all maintained at Robins. In 1973 these same C-141s supported the resupply of Israel in the Yom Kippur War. In October 1983, C-130s from Robins supported U.S. forces in the invasion of Grenada.

Between 1977 and 1981, Robins was the air base used by former President Jimmy Carter during his tenure on visits to his hometown of Plains. SAC's B-52s left Robins in 1983 leaving the 19th Wing as the sole SAC unit on the base with its KC-135s.

Modern era

In 1990–91, during the Persian Gulf War, Robins provided record numbers of parts, repairs, and personnel to coalition forces in the Persian Gulf. Robins-maintained F-15 Eagles and the E-8 Joint STARS played key roles in defeating the Iraqi military powers. In March–June 1999, during Operation Allied Force, the same employees and weapon systems played a decisive role in defeating the forces of the Yugoslavian president Slobodan Milosevic.

In 1996, the Georgia Air National Guard's 116th Fighter Wing at Dobbins AFB relinquished their F-15 aircraft and moved to Robins, transitioning to B-1 Lancer bombers and being redesignated as the 116th Bomb Wing. That same year, the former 93rd Bomb Wing at Robins was reactivated as the 93rd Air Control Wing with the E-8 Joint STARS aircraft. In 2001, the B-1 bombers left Robins AFB and the Georgia Air National Guard entered into a merged Active-Guard "associate" wing arrangement in the Joint STARS mission with the active Air Force, with the Air National Guard holding lead responsibility as the 116th Air Control Wing.

The Warner Robins Air Logistic Complex and Robins AFB form the largest single industrial complex in the State of Georgia. The 23,000 civilian employees have an annual payroll over $1 billion. The Logistic Complex manages and overhauls the F-15, C-5 Galaxy, C-130 Hercules, and the AC-130 gunships—and all of the Air Force's helicopters. In addition, the Complex also supports the C-17 Globemaster III and U-2 aircraft.

Until June 2008, Robins was also the home of the KC-135s of the 19th Air Refueling Group, when the unit was inactivated, then reactivated a month later as the 19th Airlift Wing at Little Rock AFB, Arkansas. The E-8s of the 116th Air Control Wing continues to operate at Robins as a combined Regular Air Force and Georgia Air National Guard air control wing, and the headquarters of the Air Force Reserve Command is also located on the base. The metropolis of Warner Robins, Georgia, has grown in proportion to become the sixth largest city in Georgia.

For a brief period, Robins AFB was the home of the C-27J Schoolhouse.  The schoolhouse officially began classes at Robins Air Force Base, Georgia on 9 September 2009. L-3 Link (a subsidiary of the former L3 Technologies) operated the official C-27J schoolhouse at the Georgia Department of Defense's Fixed Wing Flight Facility at Robins AFB. This flight facility included training classrooms, computer learning center, a 100-person auditorium, flight planning, and fight operations areas. The facility also housed the resident Government Flight Representative and Aviation Program Team assigned to the C-27J contract. Fixed Wing Flight Facility Robins AFB is also home of Hotel Company, 171st Aviation Regiment, Georgia Army National Guard, flying the cargo delivery Short C-23 Sherpa.  The schoolhouse was deactivated when the Air Force divested its C-27J fleet as part of the 2014 National Defence Authorization Act.

On 1 April 2016, an EF-1 tornado ripped through the northeast corner of Centerville and continued over Robins Air Force Base, ripping off hangar roofs.

Robins was one of several filming locations used in the 2020 disaster film Greenland, with the protagonist and his family being sent to the base to be evacuated in advance of a catastrophic comet impact.

Major commands

 Air Service Command, 22 July 1942

 Redesignated: Army Air Forces Materiel and Services Command, 17 July 1944
 Redesignated: Army Air Forces Technical Service Command, 31 August 1944
 Redesignated: Air Technical Service Command, 1 July 1945
 Redesignated: Air Materiel Command, 9 March 1946
 Redesignated: Air Force Logistics Command, 1 April 1961 – 1 July 1992

Air Force Materiel Command, 1 June 1992 – present
 Air Force Reserve Command, 17 February 1997–present

Major units assigned

 4th Station Complement Squadron
 Operating from Herbert Smart Airport, Macon, Georgia, 11 April 1942 – 18 August 1942
 Operating from Robins Field, 18 August 1942 – 4 January 1943
 Wellston Air Depot
 Redesignated: Warner Robins Air Depot, 22 June 1942
 Redesignated: Warner Robins Depot Area Command, 3 January 1945
 Redesignated: Warner Robins Air Service Center, TBD
 Redesignated: Warner Robins Air Technical Service Center, TBD
 Redesignated: Warner Robins Air Material Area, 21 May 1951
 Redesignated: Warner Robins Air Logistics Center, 1 April 1961 – present
 469th Base HQ and Air Base Sq, 4 January 1943 – 16 June 1943
 HQ Robins Fld, 16 June 1943 – 1 April 1944
 4117th AAF Base Unit, 3 January 1945
 Redesignated: 4117th AF Base Unit, 26 September 1947
 Redesignated: HQ, Warner Robins Air Materiel Area, 28 August 1948
 Redesignated: HQ, Warner Robins Air Materiel Area, 21 May 1951
 Redesignated: HQ, Warner Robins Air Logistics Center, 1 April 1961 – present
 2104th Air Weather Group (Military Air Transport Service (MATS)), 1 June 1948 – 24 October 1950

 1727th Air Transport Squadron (MATS), 9 October 1948 – 1 November 1954
 HQ, Fourteenth Air Force, 29 October 1949 – 1 September 1960
 2853d Air Base Wing, 1 August 1953
 Redesignated: 2853d Air Base Gp, 16 October 1964–1994
 7th Air Transport Squadron (MATS), 18 October 1954 – 8 January 1966
 4137th Strategic Wing (Strategic Air Command (SAC)), 1 February 1959 – 1 February 1963
 HQ, Continental Air Command, 16 April 1961 – 1 August 1968
 465th Bombardment Wing (SAC), 1 February 1963 – 25 July 1968
 58th Military Airlift Squadron (MAC), 6 January 1966 – 15 August 1971
 19th Bombardment Wing (SAC), 25 July 1968
 Redesignated: 19th Air Refueling Wing (SAC), 1 October 1983
 Redesignated: 19th Air Refueling Group (Air Mobility Command), 1 July 1996 – 30 September 2008
 HQ, Air Force Reserve (Agency), 1 August 1968
 Redesignated: HQ, Air Force Reserve Command (MAJCOM), 17 February 1997 – present
 78th Air Base Wing, 1 October 1994–present
 461st Air Control Wing, 2011–present
 116th Air Control Wing, 1995–present
 330th Aircraft Sustainment Wing, 2005 – 2010
 402d Maintenance Wing, 2005 – 2012
 542d Combat Sustainment Wing, 2005 – 2010

Role and operations

Warner Robins Air Logistics Complex 
Has worldwide management and engineering responsibility for the repair, modification and overhaul of the F-15 Eagle, C-130 Hercules, C-17 Globemaster III, and C-5 Galaxy, C-5M Super Galaxy, Boeing F-15E Strike Eagle, RQ-4A Global Hawk, Sikorsky HH-60G Pave Hawk aircraft. In addition to these weapon systems, the ALC has worldwide management responsibility for the U-2S Dragon Lady, all Air Force helicopters, all special operations aircraft and their peculiar avionics systems. The center also provides logistic support for all the C-17 Globemaster III, Air Force missiles, vehicles, general purpose computers, and many avionics and electronic warfare systems used on most Air Force aircraft.

Through about 7,000 employees, the Warner Robins Air Logistics Complex (WR-ALC) provides depot maintenance, engineering support and software development to major weapon systems [F-15, C-5, C-130, C-17 and Special Operations Forces (SOF) aircraft]. The Complex achieves command objectives providing a capability/capacity to support peacetime maintenance requirements, wartime emergency demands, aircraft battle damage repair and a ready source of maintenance of critical items.

Reorganized on 17 July 2012 from an Air Logistics Center to an Air Logistics Complex, it currently consists of five Groups --- see below.

78th Air Base Wing 
The wing provides support for Robins AFB and its 39 associate units. Responsible for logistics readiness, medical, civil engineer, security, comptroller activities, contracting, morale and welfare, mission support, public affairs, legal civilian personnel, environmental management, fire emergency services, and emergency management for the installation.

 78th Mission Support Group
 78th Medical Group
 78th Civil Engineer Group
 78th Security Forces Squadron
 78th Operations Support Squadron
 78th Comptroller Squadron
 78th Communications Directorate

402d Aircraft Maintenance Group (402 AMXG)
 
Provides Programmed Depot Maintenance (PDM) and unscheduled repair activities on F-15, C-130, C-5 and C-17 aircraft. Responsible for the repair, modification, reclamation and rework of over 200 aircraft worldwide. Prepares and deploys combat Aircraft Battle Damage Repair (ABDR), crash recovery and supply and transportation teams worldwide.

402d Commodities Maintenance Group (402 CMXG)

Provides depot maintenance support to major weapons systems, primarily F-15, C-5, C-130 and Special Operation Forces (SOF) aircraft, through major structural repair, manufacturing, modification, component and special process repair. Applies industrial engineering and production control programs and procedures.

402d Electronics Maintenance Group (402 EMXG)

Provides combat-ready avionics parts and services to our warfighting forces. Production encompasses 75 percent of the Air Force organic workload, consisting of 275 key systems incorporating 6,100 discrete items. Transformed capability into effects through outstanding depot-level test, maintenance, manufacturing, repair, and engineering capabilities for all Department of Defense Services and Foreign Military Sales.

402d Maintenance Support Group (402 MXSG)

Provides logistics support for depot maintenance repair facilities and provides plant facilities, equipment engineering, calibration, and installation support to the wing's infrastructure. The unit is organized into two squadrons: the Industrial Services Squadron, which manages capital investment-related programs; and the Maintenance Materiel Support Squadron, which is responsible for determining, establishing, maintaining, forecasting, and transporting inventory of consumable and exchangeable materiel required for depot maintenance.

402d Software Engineering Group (402 SWEG)

Serves as the single organic source of Mission Critical Computer Resources and Automatic Test Equipment software for all assigned prime systems and equipment and for all echelons of maintenance requiring computer programming skills and assembly level computer programming languages. Designs, develops, and provides new, altered, updated, or modified software and updates/corrects existing avionics items/system software. Provides on-site engineering assistance to identify and correct software deficiencies and provides criteria and documentation for automated equipment. Conducts feasibility studies for the application of automation to the depot maintenance process, and serve as the Automatic Test Systems focal point for the wing.

Tenant Units
 Air Force Reserve Command Headquarters
 492nd Special Operations Wing (Detachment 1)
 461st Air Control Wing [ USAF ]
 116th Air Control Wing [ Georgia ANG ]
 689th Combat Communications Wing
 5th Combat Communications Group
 Army Aviation Support Facility Robins AFB
 Hotel Company, 171st Aviation Regiment (C-23 TAC)
 C-27J Aircraft Qualification Schoolhouse
 94th Aerial Port Squadron
 367th Recruiting Group
 Robins NCO Academy
 Air Force Metrology and Calibration Program Office (AFMETCAL)

Based units 
Flying and notable non-flying units based at Robins Air Force Base.

Units marked GSU are Geographically Separate Units, which although based at Robins, are subordinate to a parent unit based at another location.

United States Air Force 

Air Force Materiel Command (AFMC)

 78th Air Base Wing (Host wing)
 Headquarters 78th Air Base Wing
 78th Comptroller Squadron
 78th Operations Support Squadron
 78th Civil Engineering Group
 78th Civil Engineer Squadron
 778th Civil Engineer Squadron 
 Engineering Division
 Installation Management Division
 78th Communications and Information Directorate
 Special Mission Division
 Operations Division
 Resource and Planning Division
 78th Medical Group
 78th Aerospace Medicine Squadron
 78th Medical Operations Squadron
 78th Medical Support Squadron 
 78th Mission Support Group
 78th Force Support Squadron
 78 Logistics Readiness Squadron
 78th Security Forces Squadron
 Air Force Sustainment Center
 Warner Robins Air Logistics Complex
 402nd Aircraft Maintenance Group
 402nd Commodities Maintenance Group 
 402nd Electronics Maintenance Group 
 402nd Maintenance Support Group 
 402nd Software Maintenance Group
 402nd Business Development & Partnership
 448th Supply Chain Management Wing
 638th Supply Chain Management Group (GSU)
 406th Supply Chain Management Squadron
 407th Supply Chain Management Squadron
 408th Supply Chain Management Squadron
 409th Supply Chain Management Squadron
 410th Supply Chain Management Squadron
 411th Supply Chain Management Squadron
 Air Force Life Cycle Management Center
 Armament Directorate
 Specialized Management Division (GSU)
 Battle Management Directorate
 Command & Control, Intelligence, Surveillance and Reconnaissance Program Office (GSU)
 JSTARS Program Office (GSU)
 Mobility Directorate
 C-5 Division (GSU)
 C-17 Division (GSU)
 Tactical Air Division (GSU)
 Fighters/Bombers Directorate
 F-15 Division (GSU)
 ISR/SOF Directorate
 Special Operations Forces/Personnel Recovery Division (GSU)
 Predator/Reaper Branch (GSU)
 Global Hawk Branch (GSU)
 U-2 Division (GSU)

Air Combat Command (ACC)

 Fifteenth Air Force
461st Air Control Wing
 Headquarters 461st Air Control Wing
 461st Operations Group
 12th Airborne Command and Control Squadron  – E-8C JSTARS
 16th Airborne Command and Control Squadron  – E-8C JSTARS
 330th Combat Training Squadron
 461st Maintenance Group
 Sixteenth Air Force
319th Reconnaissance Wing
 319th Operations Group
 18th Airborne Command and Control Squadron – E-11A BACN (GSU)
688th Cyberspace Wing
 5th Combat Communications Group (GSU)
 5th Combat Communications Support Squadron
 51st Combat Communications Squadron
 52d Combat Communications Squadron

Air Force Reserve Command (AFRC)

 Headquarters Air Force Reserve Command
Twenty-Second Air Force
94th Airlift Wing
 94th Mission Support Group
 94th Aerial Port Squadron (GSU)
413th Flight Test Group
 Headquarters 413th Flight Test Group
339th Flight Test Squadron
 413th Aeromedical Staging Squadron
 413th Force Support Flight
 Tenth Air Force
 960th Cyberspace Wing
 960th Cyberspace Operations Group
 55th Combat Communications Squadron (GSU)

Air National Guard (ANG)

 Georgia Air National Guard
 116th Air Control Wing
 Headquarters 116th Air Control Wing
 116th Operations Group
 128th Airborne Command and Control Squadron – E-8C JSTARS
 116th Maintenance Group
 116th Mission Support Group
 116th Medical Group
 202nd Engineering Installation Squadron

United States Army 
Military Intelligence Corps

 Intelligence and Security Command
 116th Military Intelligence Brigade
 138th Military Intelligence Company

Army National Guard (ARNG)

 Georgia Army National Guard
 78th Aviation Troop Command
 Army Fixed Wing Support Activity

Defence Logistics Agency 

 DLA Aviation
 DLA Disposition
 DLA Distribution
 DLA Document Services
 DLA Energy facilities

Museum of Aviation

Near the base is the Museum of Aviation, begun in 1981, has four major structures on its 51 acres and more than 85 historic aircraft. The museum is also home to the Georgia Aviation Hall of Fame which honors outstanding Georgians prominent in aviation.

The approximate 85 aircraft and missiles on display include a B-1, a B-52, an F-15, an F-16, an SR-71, a Marietta, Georgia-built B-29, and a C-123 modified as a sprayer aircraft that was used by the U.S. military as part of its Agent Orange herbicidal warfare program (Operation Ranch Hand) during the Vietnam War.

It has become a major regional educational and historical resource that hosts more than 500,000 visitors annually.

Geography
The base is located in northeastern Houston County, bordered to the west by the city of Warner Robins. The Ocmulgee River is to the east.

Demographics

Robins Air Force Base CDP is a census-designated place (CDP) and the official name for an area covering the residential population of the Robins Air Force Base, in Houston County, Georgia, United States. It was first listed as a CDP in 2002. The population at the 2020 census was 1,061.

2020 census

2010 Census
As of the 2010 census, the residential population on the base was 1,170, in 231 households, 203 of which were families. There were 245 housing units. The racial makeup of the base residents was 72.6% White, 18.5% Black or African American, 0.3% Native American, 2.1% Asian, 0.6% Pacific Islander, 0.6% some other race, and 5.3% from two or more races. Hispanic or Latino of any race were 9.2% of the population.

72.3% of the households had children under the age of 18 living with them, 75.3% were headed by married couples living together, 7.4% had a female householder with no husband present, and 12.1% were non-families. 11.7% of all households were made up of individuals, and none had someone living alone who was 65 years of age or older. The average household size was 3.33, and the average family size was 3.62.

28.4% of the residential population were under the age of 18, 38.4% were from 18 to 24, 27.5% were from 25 to 44, 5.2% were from 45 to 64, and 0.5% were 65 years of age or older. The median age was 21.5 years. For every 100 females, there were 157.1 males, and for every 100 females age 18 and over, there were 196.1 males.

For the period 2011–15, the estimated median annual income for a household in the base was $62,125, and the median income for a family was $62,375. Male full-time workers had a median income of $28,529 versus $35,500 for females. The per capita income for the base was $20,122. About 7.8% of families and 8.2% of the population were below the poverty line, including 11.4% of those under age 18 and none of those age 65 or over.

Tornadoes
As with the adjacent city of Warner Robins, tornadoes have continually plagued the base since its inception with the 1950s seeing at least two catastrophic tornadoes strike the area. The first one occurred on 30 April 1953, when an F4 tornado with winds of over 200 mph hit the base, killing 18 people near the base and injuring 300 more. Just ten months later on March 13, 1954, a long-tracked F1 tornado struck the base, killing one and injuring five. To date, at least seven tornadoes have hit the base and the surrounding area.

See also

 Air Combat Command
 Air Force Materiel Command
 Air Materiel Command
 Georgia World War II Army Airfields
 Museum of Aviation (Warner Robins)

References

 Ravenstein, Charles A. Air Force Combat Wings Lineage and Honors Histories 1947–1977. Maxwell Air Force Base, Alabama: Office of Air Force History 1984. .
 Mueller, Robert, Air Force Bases Volume I, Active Air Force Bases Within the United States of America on 17 September 1982, Office of Air Force History, 1989
 Shettle, M. L. (2005), Georgia's Army Airfields of World War II. 
Ryan Winkle. 4\25 BSTB Fort Richardson Alaska: STP-21-1-SMCT: Department of the Army- ATSE-DOT-DD: Directorate of Tranining:320 Engineer Loop-Suite 336-Fort-Leonard-Wood-MIssouri-65473-8929:Joint-Engineer-Operations:Field-Manual:5-34

External links

Installations of the United States Air Force in Georgia (U.S. state)
Installations of Strategic Air Command
Installations of the United States Air National Guard
Military Superfund sites
Buildings and structures in Houston County, Georgia
Superfund sites in Georgia (U.S. state)
Post-World War II aircraft storage facilities
World War II airfields in the United States